The 1996 Deadly Awards were hosted by Rhoda Roberts at the Metro Theatre in Sydney on 1 October 1996. Presenters included Nicky Winmar, Toni Janke, Warren Fahey and Triple J's Chris Thompson. The awards were an annual celebration of Australian Aboriginal and Torres Strait Islander achievement in music, sport, entertainment and community.

Winners
Outstanding Contribution to Aboriginal Music: Warumpi Band
Single Release of the Year: Maroochy Barambah - "Mongungi"
Album Release of the Year: Blekbala Mujik – Blekbala Mujik
Male Artist of the Year: Kev Carmody
Female Artist of the Year: Christine Anu
Band of the Year: Tiddas
Excellence in Film or Theatre Score - Alchemy - David Page
Most Promising New Talent: Wild Water
Community Broadcaster: Roxy Musk (Top FM)

References

1996 in Australian music
The Deadly Awards
Indigenous Australia-related lists